George Henry Wallace (18 September 1854 – 24 November 1927) was an English cricketer. He was educated at the Clergy Orphan School and Jesus College, Cambridge, and played one first-class match for Cambridge University Cricket Club in 1876. After graduating from Cambridge, Wallace became a barrister and was appointed a King's Counsel and a Bencher.

See also
 List of Cambridge University Cricket Club players

References

External links
 

1854 births
1927 deaths
English cricketers
Cambridge University cricketers
Cricketers from Cheshire
People educated at St Edmund's School Canterbury
Alumni of Jesus College, Cambridge
20th-century King's Counsel